is a former Nippon Professional Baseball outfielder.

External links

 Career statistics - NPB.jp 
 87 Tatsuya Ide PLAYERS2021 - Fukuoka SoftBank Hawks Official site

1971 births
Living people
Baseball people from Yamanashi Prefecture
Japanese baseball players
Nippon Professional Baseball outfielders
Nippon Ham Fighters players
Yomiuri Giants players
Fukuoka SoftBank Hawks players
Japanese baseball coaches
Nippon Professional Baseball coaches